Noel Anthony Clark (born 17 December 1940 in Cleveland, Ohio) is an American physicist, university professor at the University of Colorado Boulder, and pioneer in the development of electro-optical applications of liquid crystals.

Clark graduated from John Carroll University with a bachelor's degree in 1963 and a master's degree in 1965. He received his doctorate from Massachusetts Institute of Technology in 1970 under George Benedek. At Harvard University, Clark was a postdoc from 1970 to 1973 and an assistant professor from 1973 to 1977. At the University of Colorado he became an associate professor in 1977 and a full professor in 1981. There he heads the Liquid Crystal Materials Research Center (later Soft Materials Research Center). In 1984, he was one of the founders of Displaytech, Inc., manufacturing color TFN modules, monochrome graphic displays, and segmented TN LCDs.

In 2006 he received, jointly with Robert B. Meyer, the Oliver E. Buckley Condensed Matter Prize for basic theoretical and experimental studies on liquid crystals, in particular their ferroelectric and chiral properties (laudatio). He was elected a Fellow of the American Physical Society in 1984 and the American Association for the Advancement of Science in 2000. Since 2007 he is a member of the National Academy of Sciences. He was a Guggenheim Fellow in 1985/86 and received a Humboldt Research Award.

Selected publications

References

External links
 

1940 births
Living people
20th-century American physicists
21st-century American physicists
John Carroll University alumni
Massachusetts Institute of Technology alumni
MIT Department of Physics alumni
University of Colorado Boulder faculty
Fellows of the American Physical Society
Fellows of the American Association for the Advancement of Science
Members of the United States National Academy of Sciences
Oliver E. Buckley Condensed Matter Prize winners